The 2008–09 Boston Celtics season was the 63rd season for the franchise in the National Basketball Association (NBA). They started the season as the defending NBA champions, where they defeated the Los Angeles Lakers in six games, winning their seventeenth NBA championship, as well as marking their ninth series victory over the Lakers in the NBA Finals. The Celtics started the season 27–2, which surpassed a mark set by the 1966–67 Philadelphia 76ers for the best two-loss start in NBA history. This run also included a 19-game winning streak, which improved a Celtics franchise record set in 1981–82. However, the Celtics lost seven out of the following nine games, and eventually finished with a 62–20 record. The Celtics had the fifth best team offensive rating in the NBA.

The team's star power forward Kevin Garnett suffered a season-ending injury in February. Despite not having Garnett, they defeated the Chicago Bulls in the first round in seven games, However, they lost to the Orlando Magic in the Conference Semifinals in seven games, eliminating them from the playoffs. The Magic would go on to the NBA Finals, their second NBA Finals appearance, only to lose to last year's Finals runner-up, the Los Angeles Lakers in five games.

Key dates
June 26: The 2008 NBA draft took place in New York City.
July 1: The free agency period started.
October 8: The pre-season started with a game against the Philadelphia 76ers.
October 28: The regular season started with a game against the Cleveland Cavaliers, which Boston won 90–85.
December 11: Recorded the best season start in franchise history, starting at 21–2.
December 23: Recorded the longest winning streak in franchise history at 19, and the best season start in NBA history with 27–2.

Summary

NBA Draft 2008

On June 26, the Celtics selected shooting guard J. R. Giddens with the 30th and center Semih Erden with the 60th overall picks in the 2008 NBA draft, and traded cash considerations in exchange for small forward Bill Walker, who had been selected by the Washington Wizards with the 47th overall pick. Giddens had worked out with the Celtics before the draft for three days, and received praises from head coach Doc Rivers, who thought he could fight for minutes on the team right away. He was already familiar with future teammates Leon Powe and Kendrick Perkins, who were his teammates at the 2003 McDonald's High School All-American Game. Walker was considered a lottery pick, but suffered the third knee injury in his career during a workout at the Golden State Warriors facility on June 15. However, he remained in the draft despite the injury, and was expected to have minor surgery in July that would keep him out for three to four weeks. Erden was not expected to join the roster this season, and was seen by general manager Danny Ainge as their first-round pick in 2009.

Free agency
The Celtics headed into the off-season with several free agents and tried to gather a group to repeat as the NBA Champions, with a key decision on unrestricted free agent James Posey, who, in a widely anticipated move, opted out of the second and final year of his contract with the Celtics on June 30, but stated that he wanted to return to the Celtics on a new contract. P.J. Brown, who made key contributions during the 2008 NBA Playoffs, was leaning towards retirement, and the status of restricted free agent Tony Allen remained uncertain after the first-round selection of J. R. Giddens, who was seen as a possible replacement. Later it was revealed that the Celtics did not extend a qualifying offer to Allen, making him an unrestricted free agent. The Celtics also hoped to keep unrestricted free agent Eddie House, and decisions were to be made on unrestricted free agents Sam Cassell and Scot Pollard.

The Celtics were interested in small forward Corey Maggette as a replacement for James Posey, but Maggette signed with the Golden State Warriors on a much higher contract than the Celtics were able to offer, which added to the urgency to re-sign Posey. On July 11, the Celtics addressed their need for a backup center by signing Patrick O'Bryant to a 2-year, $3 million contract, after he had an impressive workout with the team a week earlier, and consequently ruled out the return of Scot Pollard and P.J. Brown. Eventually, James Posey signed with the New Orleans Hornets on July 16, since the Celtics were reluctant to offer him more than a three-year deal at the mid-level exception. Compensating for the loss of Posey, the Celtics re-signed Tony Allen to a 2-year, $5 million contract, and were also able to re-sign Eddie House to a 2-year, $5.6 million contract, using the mid-level exception only on House.

On August 22, the Celtics signed small forward Darius Miles, who was forced to sit out the previous two seasons due to microfracture surgery on his right knee and thought to have a career-ending injury, to a non-guaranteed contract, and expected him to fight for a roster spot at training camp. He worked out twice with the team and impressed with his health and attitude, but would sit out the first ten games of the regular season for violating the league's substance abuse policy if he made the roster. This signing ultimately put the roster up to the league maximum of 15 players, of which 14 players had fully guaranteed contracts. On September 29, the first day of training camp, Sam Cassell re-signed with the team, which put the roster one player over the maximum. On October 20, Miles was waived, a move which finalized the roster for the start of the season. On February 27, Stephon Marbury signed with the Celtics. In the following season he was offered a one year contract for the veteran's minimum for $1.3 million but declined the contract.

Draft picks

Roster

Regular season

Standings

Record vs. opponents

Game log

|- bgcolor="#bbffbb"
| 1
| October 28
| Cleveland
| 
| Paul Pierce (27)
| Kendrick Perkins (8)
| Rajon Rondo (6)
| TD Banknorth Garden18,624
| 1–0
|- bgcolor="#bbffbb"
| 2
| October 31
| Chicago
| 
| Kevin Garnett (18)
| Kevin Garnett, Kendrick Perkins (10)
| Rajon Rondo (6)
| TD Banknorth Garden18,624
| 2–0

|- bgcolor="#ffcccc"
| 3
| November 1
| @ Indiana
| 
| Kevin Garnett (18)
| Kevin Garnett (14)
| Paul Pierce, Rajon Rondo (4)
| Conseco Fieldhouse18,165
| 2–1
|- bgcolor="#bbffbb"
| 4
| November 4
| @ Houston
| 
| Ray Allen (29)
| Kevin Garnett (11)
| Rajon Rondo (7)
| Toyota Center18,291
| 3–1
|- bgcolor="#bbffbb"
| 5
| November 5
| @ Oklahoma City
| 
| Paul Pierce (20)
| Paul Pierce, Ray Allen, Kendrick Perkins (9)
| Rajon Rondo (11)
| Ford Center19,136
| 4–1
|- bgcolor="#bbffbb"
| 6
| November 7
| Milwaukee
| 
| Paul Pierce (18)
| Paul Pierce (10)
| Rajon Rondo (8)
| TD Banknorth Garden18,624
| 5–1
|- bgcolor="#bbffbb"
| 7
| November 9
| @ Detroit
| 
| Tony Allen (23)
| Kevin Garnett (12)
| Rajon Rondo (5)
| The Palace of Auburn Hills22,076
| 6–1
|- bgcolor="#bbffbb"
| 8
| November 10
| Toronto
| 
| Paul Pierce (36)
| Kevin Garnett (10)
| Paul Pierce (4)
| TD Banknorth Garden18,624
| 7–1
|- bgcolor="#bbffbb"
| 9
| November 12
| Atlanta
| 
| Paul Pierce (34)
| Kevin Garnett (12)
| Rajon Rondo (10)
| TD Banknorth Garden18,624
| 8–1
|- bgcolor="#ffcccc"
| 10
| November 14
| Denver
| 
| Ray Allen (26)
| Kevin Garnett, Kendrick Perkins (9)
| Rajon Rondo (7)
| TD Banknorth Garden18,624
| 8–2
|- bgcolor="#bbffbb"
| 11
| November 15
| @ Milwaukee
| 
| Paul Pierce (28)
| Paul Pierce, Kevin Garnett (7)
| Paul Pierce, Rajon Rondo (6)
| Bradley Center17,952
| 9–2
|- bgcolor="#bbffbb"
| 12
| November 18
| New York
| 
| Paul Pierce (22)
| Paul Pierce, Kendrick Perkins, Rajon Rondo (8)
| Rajon Rondo (7)
| TD Banknorth Garden18,624
| 10–2
|- bgcolor="#bbffbb"
| 13
| November 20
| Detroit
| 
| Rajon Rondo (18)
| Kendrick Perkins (10)
| Rajon Rondo (8)
| TD Banknorth Garden18,624
| 11–2
|- bgcolor="#bbffbb"
| 14
| November 21
| @ Minnesota
| 
| Kevin Garnett (17)
| Paul Pierce, Leon Powe (11)
| Ray Allen (6)
| Target Center19,107
| 12–2
|- bgcolor="#bbffbb"
| 15
| November 23
| @ Toronto
| 
| Ray Allen (21)
| Kendrick Perkins (8)
| Kevin Garnett (5)
| Air Canada Centre19,800
| 13–2
|- bgcolor="#bbffbb"
| 16
| November 26
| Golden State
| 
| Ray Allen (25)
| Kevin Garnett (13)
| Rajon Rondo (7)
| TD Banknorth Garden18,624
| 14–2
|- bgcolor="#bbffbb"
| 17
| November 28
| Philadelphia
| 
| Ray Allen (23)
| Kendrick Perkins (7)
| Rajon Rondo (12)
| TD Banknorth Garden18,624
| 15–2
|- bgcolor="#bbffbb"
| 18
| November 29
| @ Charlotte
| 
| Paul Pierce (19)
| Kendrick Perkins (12)
| Rajon Rondo (9)
| Time Warner Cable Arena19,177
| 16–2

|- bgcolor="#bbffbb"
| 19
| December 1
| Orlando
| 
| Paul Pierce (24)
| Kendrick Perkins (13)
| Rajon Rondo (12)
| TD Banknorth Garden18,624
| 17–2
|- bgcolor="#bbffbb"
| 20
| December 3
| Indiana
| 
| Ray Allen (31)
| Kevin Garnett (14)
| Rajon Rondo (17)
| TD Banknorth Garden18,624
| 18–2
|- bgcolor="#bbffbb"
| 21
| December 5
| Portland
| 
| Ray Allen (19)
| Kendrick Perkins (12)
| Rajon Rondo (7)
| TD Banknorth Garden18,624
| 19–2
|- bgcolor="#bbffbb"
| 22
| December 7
| @ Indiana
| 
| Ray Allen (35)
| Kevin Garnett (20)
| Paul Pierce (8)
| Conseco Fieldhouse16,102
| 20–2
|- bgcolor="#bbffbb"
| 23
| December 11
| @ Washington
| 
| Ray Allen, Paul Pierce (22)
| Kevin Garnett (12)
| Paul Pierce (8)
| Verizon Center20,173
| 21–2
|- bgcolor="#bbffbb"
| 24
| December 12
| New Orleans
| 
| Paul Pierce (28)
| Kendrick Perkins (13)
| Paul Pierce (6)
| TD Banknorth Garden18,624
| 22–2
|- bgcolor="#bbffbb"
| 25
| December 15
| Utah
| 
| Rajon Rondo (25)
| Kendrick Perkins (14)
| Rajon Rondo (8)
| TD Banknorth Garden18,624
| 23–2
|- bgcolor="#bbffbb"
| 26
| December 17
| @ Atlanta
| 
| Kevin Garnett, Paul Pierce (18)
| Kendrick Perkins (10)
| Rajon Rondo (7)
| Philips Arena18,729
| 24–2
|- bgcolor="#bbffbb"
| 27
| December 19
| Chicago
| 
| Ray Allen (27)
| Kendrick Perkins (8)
| Rajon Rondo (15)
| TD Banknorth Garden18,624
| 25–2
|- bgcolor="#bbffbb"
| 28
| December 21
| New York
| 
| Rajon Rondo (26)
| Kendrick Perkins (12)
| Kevin Garnett (8)
| TD Banknorth Garden18,624
| 26–2
|- bgcolor="#bbffbb"
| 29
| December 23
| Philadelphia
| 
| Kevin Garnett, Rajon Rondo (18)
| Kendrick Perkins (11)
| Paul Pierce (7)
| TD Banknorth Garden18,624
| 27–2
|- bgcolor="#ffcccc"
| 30
| December 25
| @ L. A. Lakers
| 
| Kevin Garnett (22)
| Paul Pierce (10)
| Rajon Rondo (12)
| Staples Center18,997
| 27–3
|- bgcolor="#ffcccc"
| 31
| December 26
| @ Golden State
| 
| Paul Pierce (21)
| Rajon Rondo (10)
| Rajon Rondo (9)
| Oracle Arena19,596
| 27–4
|- bgcolor="#bbffbb"
| 32
| December 28
| @ Sacramento
| 
| Kevin Garnett (21)
| Kendrick Perkins (12)
| Rajon Rondo (6)
| ARCO Arena16,029
| 28–4
|- bgcolor="#ffcccc"
| 33
| December 30
| @ Portland
| 
| Paul Pierce (28)
| Kevin Garnett (8)
| Rajon Rondo (7)
| Rose Garden20,651
| 28–5

|- bgcolor="#bbffbb"
| 34
| January 2
| Washington
| 
| Paul Pierce (26)
| Kendrick Perkins (10)
| Rajon Rondo (14)
| TD Banknorth Garden18,624
| 29–5
|- bgcolor="#ffcccc"
| 35
| January 4
| @ New York
| 
| Paul Pierce (31)
| Kevin Garnett (9)
| Paul Pierce (4)
| Madison Square Garden19,763
| 29–6
|- bgcolor="#ffcccc"
| 36
| January 6
| @ Charlotte
| 
| Paul Pierce (28)
| Kevin Garnett (13)
| Rajon Rondo (6)
| Time Warner Cable Arena17,112
| 29–7
|- bgcolor="#ffcccc"
| 37
| January 7
| Houston
| 
| Paul Pierce (26)
| Kevin Garnett (8)
| Ray Allen (6)
| TD Banknorth Garden18,624
| 29–8
|- bgcolor="#ffcccc"
| 38
| January 9
| @ Cleveland
| 
| Kevin Garnett (18)
| Kevin Garnett (15)
| Rajon Rondo (13)
| Quicken Loans Arena20,562
| 29–9
|- bgcolor="#bbffbb"
| 39
| January 11
| @ Toronto
| 
| Ray Allen (36)
| Kevin Garnett, Glen Davis (11)
| Rajon Rondo (11)
| Air Canada Centre19,800
| 30–9
|- bgcolor="#bbffbb"
| 40
| January 12
| Toronto
| 
| Paul Pierce (39)
| Kevin Garnett (12)
| Rajon Rondo (8)
| TD Banknorth Garden18,624
| 31–9
|- bgcolor="#bbffbb"
| 41
| January 14
| New Jersey
| 
| Paul Pierce (22)
| Kevin Garnett (9)
| Rajon Rondo (12)
| TD Banknorth Garden18,624
| 32–9
|- bgcolor="#bbffbb"
| 42
| January 17
| @ New Jersey
| 
| Ray Allen (25)
| Kevin Garnett (10)
| Rajon Rondo (14)
| Izod Center17,578
| 33–9
|- bgcolor="#bbffbb"
| 43
| January 19
| Phoenix
| 
| Rajon Rondo (23)
| Glen Davis (9)
| Paul Pierce (8)
| TD Banknorth Garden18,624
| 34–9
|- bgcolor="#bbffbb"
| 44
| January 21
| @ Miami
| 
| Ray Allen (27)
| Kevin Garnett (13)
| Rajon Rondo (10)
| American Airlines Arena19,600
| 35–9
|- bgcolor="#bbffbb"
| 45
| January 22
| @ Orlando
| 
| Paul Pierce (27)
| Paul Pierce (10)
| Paul Pierce (4)
| Amway Arena17,461
| 36–9
|- bgcolor="#bbffbb"
| 46
| January 25
| Dallas
| 
| Eddie House, Ray Allen, Kevin Garnett (23)
| Rajon Rondo (7)
| Rajon Rondo (14)
| TD Banknorth Garden18,624
| 37–9
|- bgcolor="#bbffbb"
| 47
| January 28
| Sacramento
| 
| Eddie House (28)
| Tony Allen, Kevin Garnett (8)
| Rajon Rondo (9)
| TD Banknorth Garden18,624
| 38–9
|- bgcolor="#bbffbb"
| 48
| January 30
| @ Detroit
| 
| Kevin Garnett (22)
| Kevin Garnett (9)
| Rajon Rondo (12)
| The Palace of Auburn Hills22,076
| 39–9

|- bgcolor="#bbffbb"
| 49
| February 1
| Minnesota
| 
| Paul Pierce (36)
| Kendrick Perkins (11)
| Rajon Rondo (8)
| TD Banknorth Garden18,624
| 40–9
|- bgcolor="#bbffbb"
| 50
| February 3
| @ Philadelphia
| 
| Paul Pierce (29)
| Glen Davis (11)
| Rajon Rondo (8)
| Wachovia Center16,831
| 41–9
|- bgcolor="#ffcccc"
| 51
| February 5
| L. A. Lakers
| 
| Ray Allen (22)
| Kendrick Perkins (9)
| Rajon Rondo (12)
| TD Banknorth Garden18,624
| 41–10
|- bgcolor="#bbffbb"
| 52
| February 6
| @ New York
| 
| Paul Pierce (26)
| Kevin Garnett (11)
| Rajon Rondo (7)
| Madison Square Garden19,763
| 42–10
|- bgcolor="#ffcccc"
| 53
| February 8
| San Antonio
| 
| Kevin Garnett (26)
| Kevin Garnett (12)
| Rajon Rondo (16)
| TD Banknorth Garden18,624
| 42–11
|- bgcolor="#bbffbb"
| 54
| February 11
| @ New Orleans
| 
| Paul Pierce (30)
| Kevin Garnett (10)
| Rajon Rondo (11)
| New Orleans Arena18,080
| 43–11
|- bgcolor="#bbffbb"
| 55
| February 12
| @ Dallas
| 
| Paul Pierce (31)
| Rajon Rondo (15)
| Rajon Rondo (14)
| American Airlines Center20,285
| 44–11
|- align="center"
| colspan="9" style="background:#bbcaff;" | All-Star Break
|- bgcolor="#ffcccc"
| 56
| February 19
| @ Utah
| 
| Paul Pierce (20)
| Kendrick Perkins (11)
| Rajon Rondo (7)
| EnergySolutions Arena19,911
| 44–12
|- bgcolor="#bbffbb"
| 57
| February 22
| @ Phoenix
| 
| Rajon Rondo (32)
| Eddie House, Rajon Rondo, Paul Pierce, Kendrick Perkins, Leon Powe (6)
| Rajon Rondo (10)
| US Airways Center18,422
| 45–12
|- bgcolor="#bbffbb"
| 58
| February 23
| @ Denver
| 
| Ray Allen (26)
| Rajon Rondo (8)
| Rajon Rondo (8)
| Pepsi Center19,784
| 46–12
|- bgcolor="#ffcccc"
| 59
| February 25
| @ L. A. Clippers
| 
| Paul Pierce (20)
| Kendrick Perkins, Leon Powe (9)
| Ray Allen (6)
| Staples Center18,609
| 46–13
|- bgcolor="#bbffbb"
| 60
| February 27
| Indiana
| 
| Ray Allen (30)
| Kendrick Perkins (11)
| Rajon Rondo (17)
| TD Banknorth Garden18,624
| 47–13

|- bgcolor="#ffcccc"
| 61
| March 1
| Detroit
| 
| Paul Pierce (26)
| Glen Davis, Rajon Rondo, Paul Pierce, Kendrick Perkins (6)
| Rajon Rondo (6)
| TD Banknorth Garden18,624
| 47–14
|- bgcolor="#bbffbb"
| 62
| March 4
| @ New Jersey
| 
| Paul Pierce (31)
| Kendrick Perkins (13)
| Paul Pierce, Rajon Rondo (5)
| Izod Center15,791
| 48–14
|- bgcolor="#bbffbb"
| 63
| March 6
| Cleveland
| 
| Paul Pierce (29)
| Leon Powe (11)
| Rajon Rondo (10)
| TD Banknorth Garden18,624
| 49–14
|- bgcolor="#ffcccc"
| 64
| March 8
| Orlando
| 
| Ray Allen (32)
| Ray Allen (9)
| Paul Pierce (3)
| TD Banknorth Garden18,624
| 49–15
|- bgcolor="#ffcccc"
| 65
| March 11
| @ Miami
| 
| Ray Allen (27)
| Leon Powe (13)
| Stephon Marbury (4)
| American Airlines Arena19,600
| 49–16
|- bgcolor="#bbffbb"
| 66
| March 13
| Memphis
| 
| Leon Powe (30)
| Leon Powe (11)
| Rajon Rondo (8)
| TD Banknorth Garden18,624
| 50–16
|- bgcolor="#ffcccc"
| 67
| March 15
| @ Milwaukee
| 
| Kendrick Perkins (26)
| Kendrick Perkins (12)
| Rajon Rondo (8)
| Bradley Center18,134
| 50–17
|- bgcolor="#ffcccc"
| 68
| March 17
| @ Chicago
| 
| Paul Pierce (37)
| Kendrick Perkins, Mikki Moore (10)
| Rajon Rondo (10)
| United Center22,107
| 50–18
|- bgcolor="#bbffbb"
| 69
| March 18
| Miami
| 
| Paul Pierce (36)
| Paul Pierce (11)
| Rajon Rondo (10)
| TD Banknorth Garden18,624
| 51–18
|- bgcolor="#bbffbb"
| 70
| March 20
| @ San Antonio
| 
| Ray Allen (19)
| Paul Pierce (12)
| Rajon Rondo (12)
| AT&T Center18,797
| 52–18
|- bgcolor="#bbffbb"
| 71
| March 21
| @ Memphis
| 
| Glen Davis (24)
| Rajon Rondo (7)
| Rajon Rondo (10)
| FedExForum18,119
| 53–18
|- bgcolor="#bbffbb"
| 72
| March 23
| L. A. Clippers
| 
| Ray Allen (20)
| Kendrick Perkins (13)
| Rajon Rondo (7)
| TD Banknorth Garden18,624
| 54–18
|- bgcolor="#ffcccc"
| 73
| March 25
| @ Orlando
| 
| Paul Pierce (26)
| Kendrick Perkins (11)
| Ray Allen, Rajon Rondo (5)
| Amway Arena17,461
| 54–19
|- bgcolor="#bbffbb"
| 74
| March 27
| @ Atlanta
| 
| Ray Allen (22)
| Glen Davis (12)
| Paul Pierce, Rajon Rondo (5)
| Philips Arena20,054
| 55–19
|- bgcolor="#bbffbb"
| 75
| March 29
| Oklahoma City
| 
| Paul Pierce (27)
| Mikki Moore (11)
| Rajon Rondo (12)
| TD Banknorth Garden18,624
| 56–19

|- bgcolor="#bbffbb"
| 76
| April 1
| Charlotte
| 
| Paul Pierce (32)
| Kendrick Perkins (12)
| Rajon Rondo (9)
| TD Banknorth Garden18,624
| 57–19
|- bgcolor="#bbffbb"
| 77
| April 3
| Atlanta
| 
| Paul Pierce (21)
| Kendrick Perkins (10)
| Rajon Rondo (6)
| TD Banknorth Garden18,624
| 58–19
|- bgcolor="#bbffbb"
| 78
| April 8
| New Jersey
| 
| Rajon Rondo (31)
| Rajon Rondo, Kendrick Perkins, Mikki Moore (9)
| Rajon Rondo, Stephon Marbury (5)
| TD Banknorth Garden18,624
| 59–19
|- bgcolor="#bbffbb"
| 79
| April 10
| Miami
| 
| Paul Pierce (28)
| Rajon Rondo (10)
| Rajon Rondo (12)
| TD Banknorth Garden18,624
| 60–19
|- bgcolor="#ffcccc"
| 80
| April 12
| @ Cleveland
| 
| Paul Pierce (14)
| Kendrick Perkins (6)
| Rajon Rondo (6)
| Quicken Loans Arena20,562
| 60–20
|- bgcolor="#bbffbb"
| 81
| April 14
| @ Philadelphia
| 
| Paul Pierce (31)
| Kendrick Perkins (12)
| Tony Allen, Stephon Marbury (5)
| Wachovia Center17,752
| 61–20
|- bgcolor="#bbffbb"
| 82
| April 15
| Washington
| 
| Glen Davis (21)
| Leon Powe (13)
| Stephon Marbury (8)
| TD Banknorth Garden18,624
| 62–20

Playoffs

Game log

|- bgcolor="#ffcccc"
| 1
| April 18
| Chicago
| 
| Rajon Rondo (29)
| Rajon Rondo (9)
| Rajon Rondo (7)
| TD Banknorth Garden18,624
| 0–1
|- bgcolor="#ccffcc"
| 2
| April 20
| Chicago
| 
| Ray Allen (30)
| Rajon Rondo, Kendrick Perkins (12)
| Rajon Rondo (16)
| TD Banknorth Garden18,624
| 1–1
|- bgcolor="#ccffcc"
| 3
| April 23
| @ Chicago
| 
| Paul Pierce (24)
| Rajon Rondo (11)
| Glen Davis, Stephon Marbury (6)
| United Center23,072
| 2–1
|- bgcolor="#ffcccc"
| 4
| April 26
| @ Chicago
| 
| Paul Pierce (29)
| Glen Davis (12)
| Rajon Rondo (11)
| United Center23,067
| 2–2
|- bgcolor="ccffcc"
| 5
| April 28
| Chicago
| 
| Rajon Rondo (28)
| Kendrick Perkins (19)
| Rajon Rondo (16)
| TD Banknorth Garden18,624
| 3–2
|- bgcolor="#ffcccc"
| 6
| April 30
| @ Chicago
| 
| Ray Allen (51)
| Kendrick Perkins (13)
| Rajon Rondo (19)
| United Center23,430
| 3–3
|- bgcolor="ccffcc"
| 7
| May 2
| Chicago
| 
| Ray Allen (23)
| Kendrick Perkins (13)
| Rajon Rondo (11)
| TD Banknorth Garden18,624
| 4–3

|- bgcolor="#ffcccc"
| 1
| May 4
| Orlando
| 
| Paul Pierce (23)
| Kendrick Perkins (16)
| Rajon Rondo (8)
| TD Banknorth Garden18,624
| 0–1
|- bgcolor="ccffcc"
| 2
| May 6
| Orlando
| 
| Eddie House (31)
| Rajon Rondo (11)
| Rajon Rondo (18)
| TD Banknorth Garden18,624
| 1–1
|- bgcolor="#ffcccc"
| 3
| May 8
| @ Orlando
| 
| Paul Pierce (27)
| Kendrick Perkins (7)
| Paul Pierce, Rajon Rondo (6)
| Amway Arena17,461
| 1–2
|- bgcolor="ccffcc"
| 4
| May 10
| @ Orlando
| 
| Paul Pierce (27)
| Rajon Rondo (14)
| Ray Allen (4)
| Amway Arena17,461
| 2–2
|- bgcolor="ccffcc"
| 5
| May 12
| Orlando
| 
| Glen Davis (22)
| Kendrick Perkins (11)
| Paul Pierce (8)
| TD Banknorth Garden18,624
| 3–2
|- bgcolor="#ffcccc"
| 6
| May 14
| @ Orlando
| 
| Rajon Rondo (19)
| Rajon Rondo (16)
| Rajon Rondo (6)
| Amway Arena17,461
| 3–3
|- bgcolor="#ffcccc"
| 7
| May 17
| Orlando
| 
| Ray Allen (23)
| Kendrick Perkins (15)
| Rajon Rondo (10)
| TD Banknorth Garden18,624
| 3–4

Player statistics

Regular season

|-
| 
| 79 || 79 || 36.4 || .480 || .409 || style="background:#efe196;color:#008040;" | .952 || 3.5 || 2.8 || 0.87 || 0.16 || 18.2
|-
| 
| 46 || 2 || 19.3 || .482 || .222 || .725 || 2.3 || 1.4 || 1.17 || 0.50 || 7.8
|-
| 
| 76 || 16 || 21.5 || .442 || .400 || .730 || 4.0 || 0.9 || 0.70 || 0.25 || 7.0
|-
| 
| 57 || 57 || 31.1 || .531 || .250 || .841 || style="background:#efe196;color:#008040;" | 8.5 || 2.5 || 1.11 || 1.19 || 15.8
|-
| 
| 6 || 0 || 1.3 || style="background:#efe196;color:#008040;" | .667 || .000 || .000 || 0.5 || 0.0 || 0.17 || 0.00 || 0.7
|-
| 
| style="background:#efe196;color:#008040;" | 81 || 0 || 18.3 || .445 || style="background:#efe196;color:#008040;" | .444 || .792 || 1.9 || 1.1 || 0.75 || 0.09 || 8.5
|-
| 
| 23 || 4 || 18.0 || .342 || .240 || .462 || 1.2 || 3.3 || 0.43 || 0.13 || 3.8
|-
| 
| 24 || 0 || 19.0 || .600 || .000 || .737 || 4.4 || 1.0 || 0.17 || 0.21 || 4.8
|-
| 
| 26 || 0 || 4.2 || .516 || .000 || .667 || 1.3 || 0.3 || 0.12 || 0.31 || 1.5
|-
| 
| 76 || 76 || 29.6 || .577 || .000 || .600 || 8.1 || 1.3 || 0.29 || style="background:#efe196;color:#008040;" | 1.97 || 8.5
|-
| 
| style="background:#efe196;color:#008040;" | 81 || style="background:#efe196;color:#008040;" | 81 || style="background:#efe196;color:#008040;" | 37.5 || .457 || .391 || .830 || 5.6 || 3.6 || 0.99 || 0.33 || style="background:#efe196;color:#008040;" | 20.5
|-
| 
| 70 || 7 || 17.5 || .524 || .000 || .689 || 4.9 || 0.7 || 0.34 || 0.54 || 7.7
|-
| 
| 47 || 0 || 7.8 || .307 || .292 || .810 || 0.9 || 0.8 || 0.32 || 0.06 || 2.0
|-
| 
| 80 || 80 || 33.0 || .505 || .313 || .642 || 5.2 || style="background:#efe196;color:#008040;" | 8.2 || style="background:#efe196;color:#008040;" | 1.86 || 0.14 || 11.9
|-
| 
| 39 || 8 || 12.9 || .421 || .393 || .889 || 1.3 || 0.5 || 0.18 || 0.26 || 3.5
|-
| 
| 29 || 0 || 7.4 || .621 || .000 || .696 || 1.0 || 0.4 || 0.21 || 0.07 || 3.0
|}
*Statistics with the Boston Celtics

Playoffs

|-
| 
| style="background:#efe196;color:#008040;" | 14 || style="background:#efe196;color:#008040;" | 14 || 40.4 || .403 || .350 || .948 || 3.9 || 2.6 || 1.07 || 0.36 || 18.3
|-
| 
| 10 || 0 || 6.0 || .500 || .000 || style="background:#efe196;color:#008040;" | 1.000 || 0.9 || 0.3 || 0.20 || 0.00 || 0.9
|-
| 
| style="background:#efe196;color:#008040;" | 14 || style="background:#efe196;color:#008040;" | 14 || 36.4 || .491 || .000 || .710 || 5.6 || 1.8 || 1.29 || 0.57 || 15.8
|-
| 
| style="background:#efe196;color:#008040;" | 14 || 0 || 16.6 || .519 || style="background:#efe196;color:#008040;" | .486 || .909 || 1.4 || 0.9 || 0.79 || 0.00 || 7.7
|-
| 
| style="background:#efe196;color:#008040;" | 14 || 0 || 11.9 || .303 || .250 || style="background:#efe196;color:#008040;" | 1.000 || 0.9 || 1.8 || 0.07 || 0.00 || 3.7
|-
| 
| 10 || 0 || 6.6 || .500 || .000 || .833 || 1.5 || 0.4 || 0.20 || 0.50 || 1.5
|-
| 
| style="background:#efe196;color:#008040;" | 14 || style="background:#efe196;color:#008040;" | 14 || 36.6 || style="background:#efe196;color:#008040;" | .575 || .000 || .667 || style="background:#efe196;color:#008040;" | 11.6 || 1.4 || 0.43 || style="background:#efe196;color:#008040;" | 2.64 || 11.9
|-
| 
| style="background:#efe196;color:#008040;" | 14 || style="background:#efe196;color:#008040;" | 14 || 39.7 || .430 || .333 || .842 || 5.8 || 3.1 || 1.07 || 0.36 || style="background:#efe196;color:#008040;" | 21.0
|-
| 
| 2 || 0 || 12.0 || .429 || .000 || .667 || 4.5 || 0.0 || 0.00 || 0.00 || 5.0
|-
| 
| 4 || 0 || 2.8 || .000 || .000 || .000 || 0.0 || 0.5 || 0.00 || 0.25 || 0.0
|-
| 
| style="background:#efe196;color:#008040;" | 14 || style="background:#efe196;color:#008040;" | 14 || style="background:#efe196;color:#008040;" | 41.2 || .417 || .250 || .657 || 9.7 || style="background:#efe196;color:#008040;" | 9.8 || style="background:#efe196;color:#008040;" | 2.50 || 0.21 || 16.9
|-
| 
| 12 || 0 || 20.5 || .423 || .448 || style="background:#efe196;color:#008040;" | 1.000 || 2.2 || 1.0 || 0.17 || 0.42 || 5.1
|-
| 
| 4 || 0 || 2.5 || .000 || .000 || style="background:#efe196;color:#008040;" | 1.000 || 0.0 || 0.0 || 0.50 || 0.00 || 0.5
|}

Salaries

Awards, records and milestones

Awards

Week/Month
Head coach Doc Rivers was named Eastern Conference Coach of the Month for games played in October and November.

All-Star

 Ray Allen was selected to his 9th NBA All–Star Game
 Paul Pierce was selected to his 7th NBA All–Star Game
 Kevin Garnett was selected as a starter to his 12th NBA All–Star Game

Season

Records
On February 22, Ray Allen broke the team record for consecutive free-throws made with 72, eclipsing the previous mark of 71 by Larry Bird.
With 7 blocks against the Milwaukee Bucks on November 7, Kendrick Perkins had the most blocks in a game by a Celtics player since Kevin McHale had 8 on January 9, 1987.
With 22 points in the fourth quarter against the Toronto Raptors on November 10, Paul Pierce had the most points in a quarter by a Celtics player since Todd Day had 24 in 1995.
Head coach Doc Rivers became the third coach in NBA history to win the Coach of the Month award for three straight months, joining Flip Saunders (2005–06) and Larry Brown (2002–03).
Rajon Rondo had the first triple-double by a Celtics player since Paul Pierce accomplished it on February 2, 2005, in a win against the Indiana Pacers on December 3.
With 19 straight wins, the Celtics recorded the longest winning streak in franchise history with a win against the Philadelphia 76ers on December 23, breaking the previous record of 18 straight wins held by the  Celtics, and matched the fourth longest winning streak in NBA history.
With a 27–2 season start, the Celtics were off to the best opening in franchise history and NBA history.
The Celtics matched their 6th biggest win in franchise history with a 108-63 blowout victory over the Sacramento Kings on December 28, 2008.
The Celtics lost four games in a row for the first time since acquiring Ray Allen and Kevin Garnett.
The Celtics recorded the most points in overtime (22) in franchise history, breaking the previous record of 21 set on January 2, 1963 against the Golden State Warriors.

Milestones
Kevin Garnett became the youngest player (32 years, 165 days) in NBA history to reach 1,000 career games by passing Shawn Kemp (33 years, 24 days) against the Chicago Bulls on October 31.
Paul Pierce moved up to 2nd in made free throws in Celtics history by passing Bob Cousy with a free-throw in the second quarter against the Toronto Raptors on November 10.
Paul Pierce moved up to 4th on Boston's all-time scoring list by passing Kevin McHale with a layup in the second quarter against the Indiana Pacers on December 7.
Kevin Garnett moved up to 26th in points in NBA history by passing Walt Bellamy with a jumper in the first quarter against the Houston Rockets on January 7.
Kevin Garnett passed 21,000 points for his career with a field goal in the fourth quarter against the Toronto Raptors on January 12.\
Rajon Rondo completed his first career triple-double December 3, 2008 with 16 points, 13 rebounds, and 17 assists. He followed up with his second career triple-double February 12, 2009 with 19 points, 15 rebounds (career high), and 14 assists.

Injuries and surgeries
July 2: Kendrick Perkins underwent surgery on his left strained shoulder which he injured during the 2008 NBA Finals.
July 2: Bill Walker underwent surgery to repair a torn meniscus in his right knee which he suffered during a workout at the Golden State Warriors facility prior to the 2008 NBA draft on June 15, 2008.
July 11: Paul Pierce had an MRI on his right knee which showed no significant problem. He suffered the injury during Game 1 of the 2008 NBA Finals, which was later diagnosed as a sprained MCL and a bone bruise.

Transactions

Trades

Free agents

Additions

Departures

References

External links
2008–09 Boston Celtics season at Basketball Reference

Boston Celtics seasons
Boston Celtics
Boston Celtics
Boston Celtics
Celtics
Celtics